Sal-like protein 3, also known as zinc finger protein SALL3, is a protein that in humans in encoded by the SALL3 gene.

References

Further reading

Transcription factors